Amante de lo Ajeno is the second solo studio album by Mexican singer María José. The name is a play on words, as it is a cover album. It was released on 12 May 2009 on the Sei Track Musica label, a division of Grupo CIE, and reached number 2 in the Mexican album charts.

The album includes 11 tracks that are part of the Mexican musical memory, previously sung by "divas" and pop singers of the '80s. The aim was to pay homage to performers such as Manoella Torres, Daniela Romo, María Conchita Alonso, Lucía Méndez, Ana Gabriel, Jeanette, Vikki Carr, Fiordaliso, Loredana Bertè, Rocío Banquells, Crystal and Melissa. The album was recorded in Riolo Terme, Italy and produced by Loris Cerroni. No Soy Una Señora, originally sung by Melissa, is the first single from the album. José said it brought back memories: "For 9 years I sang in front of the mirror, I put on my 'Walkman', grabbed my deodorant and sang."

The album has been promoted on Mexican national radio and in TV interviews, and José has performed the single No Soy Una Señora at many events. A year after the original release of the album, Amante de lo Ajeno was re-released as a special edition that included 2 newly recorded covers plus a DVD that featured a concert.

Track listing

The album has been certified Gold in Mexico for its 50,000 copies in just 8 weeks on the chart. The album recently has been certified Platinum in Mexico for over 100,000 copies sold in the 30 week on the Mexican Album Chart. Later a year in April the album was certified 2xPlatinum for 180,000 sold in Mexico.

Charts

Certifications

References

María José (singer) albums
2009 albums